Little Bets: How Breakthrough Ideas Emerge from Small Discoveries is a book written by Peter Sims, published by Free Press in January 2011.

The book promotes the idea of small-scale experimentation (or "little bets") as a key part of the creative process.  Little bets allow innovators to try new ideas with low failure costs, but potentially large rewards.  The book examines successful examples of "little bets" in the business and entertainment worlds, as well as relevant social science research.

Little Bets has been reviewed in the Wall Street Journal (where it was described as "An enthusiastic, example-rich argument for innovating in a particular way") and Kirkus Reviews (where it was described as "a veritable gumball machine of memorable anecdotes to inspire creativity" ).

References

Further reading
 
 

2011 non-fiction books
Free Press (publisher) books
Self-help books